Bharatpur Junction railway station (station code: BTE) is a station in Bharatpur, Rajasthan, India, located on the Mathura–Kota section of the New Delhi–Mumbai main line of Indian Railways. It is an important station of the West Central Railway zone (WCR) and has the status of Grade A station.

Bharatpur Junction has five platforms and all are electrified. Apart from the Delhi – Mumbai main line, the Agra–Bandikui–Jaipur line also passes through Bharatpur Junction. The former line is electrified, while the latter is still plying on diesel.

Keoladeo National Park is located approximately 5 km from the Bharatpur Railway Station.

References

External links 

Railway junction stations in Rajasthan
Railway stations in Bharatpur district
Kota railway division